The 2019 Combined Japan Cup was the second of the competition. It was organized by the JMSCA (Japan Mountaineering and Sport Climbing Association). It was held from 25 to 26 May 2019 in Saijō city, Ehime Prefecture. The athletes competed in combined format of three disciplines: speed, bouldering, and lead. The winner for men was Tomoa Narasaki and for women was Miho Nonaka.

Schedule

Competition format 
It was held to simulate the latest Olympic combined format. It was also held to decide the athletes to compete in the 2019 IFSC Climbing World Championships in August.

Athletes were ranked based on their scores in separate disciplines. Points were calculated by multiplying the ranks of each athlete in the three disciplines.

Men 
Tomoa Narasaki set a new Japan national record for speed climbing of 6.291s in the finals.

Women 
Miho Nonaka set a new Japan national record for speed climbing of 8.499s in the qualifications.

References 

Climbing Japan Cup
2019 in sport climbing